("The Ideals"), S. 106, is a symphonic poem composed by Franz Liszt in 1856–1857 and published in 1858 as No. 12. It was first performed on 5 September 1857. Die Ideale was composed for the unveiling of a Goethe and Schiller monument on Sept. 5th, 1857. It was inspired by multiple passages of the poem of the same name by Schiller, which Liszt liberally rearranged to create a program to his liking. This is an example of the extreme to which Liszt went to create the programmatic atmosphere of his Symphonic Poems.

References

External links
 

Symphonic poems by Franz Liszt
1857 compositions